Mogilino is a village in Ruse Province, northern Bulgaria. It became well known internationally after several reports about the institution for children with physical and mental disabilities. In 2007, the BBC showed the film "Bulgaria's Abandoned Children". The British public were deeply disturbed  and  started a petition to the Prime Minister to intervene and put pressure on EU institutions and the Bulgarian government to solve the problem.  Many British, Bulgarian and international charities  intensified their work effort to solve the problem with abandoned children in the country. The case of Mogilino resembles the campaign publicising the conditions in the Romanian orphanages in the early 1990s. Bulgaria has been criticised for having one of the highest numbers of children in state institutional care in the EU.

On 30 January 2008 Bulgarian National Television presented its answer to the BBC documentary in the form of a documentary called Dom (House or Home). "It is not right that the whole of Europe be antagonised against Bulgaria because of a well-manipulated and skilfully edited documentary on a home being prepared to close down, such as Mogilino,” the  makers said.

On the same day, Bulgarian Members of the European Parliament signed a declaration in which they called for "a common European policy on the upbringing and education of underprivileged children."

On 22 February 2008 Labour and Social Policy Minister Emilia Maslarova repeated a promise that the Mogilino home, along with six similar homes, would be closed .

At the initiative of Irish member of the European Parliament Kathy Sinnott, Kate Blewett's documentary was screened in the European Parliament on 4 March 2008. 

On 27 June 2008 The Sofia Echo reported that some of the children from the Mogilino home had been relocated to other homes around Bulgaria, and that the Agency for Social Assistance and UNICEF were working, ultimately, to close the home. 

The Mogilino Children's Institution finally closed on 1 October 2009, following further pressure from the BBC and the EU.

External links
 Campaign for Bulgaria's Abandoned Children
 Report on institutions for children in Bulgaria by the Bulgarian Helsinki Committee
 Moglino case blog (in Bulgarian)
 Report on Sky TV, 2006
 Friends of Bulgaria UK charity, information on Mogilino and other children institutions in Bulgaria
 The Sofia Echo article, 6 November 2007: "Mogilino Social Care Home for disabled children to be closed after BBC documentary aired"
 Sofia Echo article, 7 November 2007: "Debate on Bulgaria's Abandoned Children"
 The Sofia Echo article, 30 January 2008: BNT strikes back at BBC's Mogilino Documentary
 The Sofia Echo article, 30 January 2008: Bulgarian MEPs call for European policy on underprivileged children
 The Sofia Echo article, 29 February 2008: Bulgarian Social Minister angry with Brussels over Mogilino screening
 Mogilino, Lost in translation, 14 March 2008. The article analyses translation errors in the BBC film Bulgaria's Abandoned Children

Villages in Ruse Province